Verdonk and Verdonck are Dutch toponymic surnames. They are a contraction of van der Donk ("from the donk"), where "donk" was a name for sandy raised terrain in a swamp. The spelling Verdonk is more common in the Netherlands (2126 vs. 261 people in 2007), while Verdonck is more common in Belgium (4341 vs 118 people in 2008). Notable people with the surname include:

Verdonk
Calvin Verdonk (born 1997), Dutch footballer
Eric Verdonk (born 1959), New Zealand rower
Lambert Verdonk (born 1944), Dutch footballer
Rita Verdonk (born 1955), Dutch politician
Verdonck
Cornelis Verdonck (1563–1625), Flemish composer
 (1546–1624), Flemish composer
Maurice Verdonck (1873–?), Belgian rower
Nico Verdonck (born 1985), Belgian racing driver
Rudy Verdonck (born 1965), Belgian cyclist
Sven Verdonck (born 1988), Belgian footballer

See also
Adriaen van der Donck (c.1618–1656), Dutch lawyer in New Netherland
Sabrina van der Donk (born 1988), Dutch model

References

Toponymic surnames
Dutch-language surnames